Fred Robinson (1881 – after 1906) was an English professional footballer who played as an inside forward.

References

1881 births
People from Belper
Footballers from Derbyshire
English footballers
Association football inside forwards
Belper Town F.C. players
Grimsby Town F.C. players
Rotherham County F.C. players
English Football League players
Year of death missing